Pizza snack rolls (also called pizza rolls, pizza bites, pizza snacks, or pizza poppers)  are a frozen food product consisting of bite-sized breaded pizza pockets with an interior of tomato sauce, imitation cheese and various pizza toppings. They are sold in a variety of flavors including imitation cheese, pepperoni, sausage, supreme, multiple imitation cheeses, and mixed meats. Other flavors included hamburger, cheeseburger, ham and cheese, and combination (pepperoni and sausage). Pizza snack rolls are designed to be quickly cooked in the oven or microwave. The name "pizza rolls" is a trademark of General Mills, current owner of the original product.

They were created in Duluth, Minnesota, United States, by food industry entrepreneur Jeno Paulucci, who specialized in canned and frozen Chinese food. Jeno's began using the Pizza Rolls trademark in 1967. In 1985, Paulucci sold Jeno's to Pillsbury, which owned Totino's pizza. In 1993, Jeno's Pizza Rolls were rebranded as Totino's Pizza Rolls. Pillsbury was sold to General Mills in 2001. After a series of commercial spoofs on Saturday Night Live, Totino's pizza rolls saw a boost in popularity and sales in 2016. 

Pizza snack rolls are produced by a large number of brands, gourmet brands and store brands. Since the original name is trademark protected, various companies use different names for their product. There are non-GMO, organic and vegan versions offered by some companies.

See also
 Calzone
 Pizza bagel
 Pocket sandwich
 Samosa
 List of stuffed dishes

References

External links
Totino's products

Pizza in the United States
General Mills brands
Products introduced in 1967